Martin Briggs (born 4 January 1964) is a British hurdler. He competed in the men's 400 metres hurdles at the 1984 Summer Olympics.

References

External links
 

1964 births
Living people
Athletes (track and field) at the 1984 Summer Olympics
British male hurdlers
Olympic athletes of Great Britain
Place of birth missing (living people)